We're Here Because We're Here may refer to:

 We're Here Because We're Here (album), by the band Anathema
 We're Here Because We're Here (art event), commemorating the 100th anniversary of the first day of the Battle of the Somme, on 1 July 2016
 "We're Here Because We're Here", song sung in the World War I trenches to the tune of "Auld Lang Syne".